Heath Arthur Davidson,  (born 9 May 1987) is an Australian wheelchair tennis player. Davidson is a four-time Australian Open doubles champion, all partnering Dylan Alcott. He has also won two Paralympic medals, a gold and silver in doubles at the 2016 Rio and 2020 Tokyo Paralympics, respectively (both also partnering Alcott).

Early life
Davidson was born on 9 May 1987. He contracted viral transverse myelitis at the age of five months and this led to paraplegia. He attended Parkdale Secondary College in Melbourne.

Tennis
Davidson started playing wheelchair tennis at the age of 14. In 2001, At the Australian Disabled Games in Queensland he won a bronze medal in wheelchair tennis and two silver medals for table tennis. After ten years he retired from the sport.

After Davidson returned to wheelchair tennis, he teamed with Dylan Alcott to win the prestigious BNP Paribas World Team Cup held in Tokyo, Japan in May 2016. They upset Great Britain in the final. Davidson and Alcott won the Men's Quad Doubles gold medal at the Rio Paralympics. They defeated the reigning champions David Wagner and Nick Taylor in the gold medal match 4–6, 6–4, 7–5. In the Men's Quad Singles, Davidson lost to Andy Lapthorne (GBR) 0–2 (1–6, 2–6) in the quarter-finals.

In May 2017, Davidson won his first international quad singles title by winning the Korea Open. In 2019, Davidson and his partner Niels Vink won the 2019 Wheelchair Tennis Masters in quad doubles.

At the 2020 Tokyo Paralympics, he teamed with Alcott to win the Men's Quad Doubles silver medal. He lost in the Men's Quad Singles quarter final.

Recognition
Davidson won the Variety Australia Young Sports Achievers Award in 2003 with Dylan Alcott. In 2016, he shared Tennis Australia's Most Outstanding Athlete with a Disability with doubles partner Dylan Alcott. He was awarded the Medal of the Order of Australia in 2017. In 2022, he was awarded Tennis Australia's Most Outstanding Athlete with a Disability.

Grand Slam tournament finals

Quad doubles

References

External links
 
 
 
 

1987 births
Living people
Australian male tennis players
Australian wheelchair tennis players
Wheelchair category Paralympic competitors
Paralympic wheelchair tennis players of Australia
Paralympic gold medalists for Australia
Paralympic silver medalists for Australia
Paralympic medalists in wheelchair tennis
Medalists at the 2016 Summer Paralympics
Medalists at the 2020 Summer Paralympics
Wheelchair tennis players at the 2016 Summer Paralympics
Wheelchair tennis players at the 2020 Summer Paralympics
People with paraplegia
Recipients of the Medal of the Order of Australia
Tennis people from Victoria (Australia)
People from Mornington Peninsula
Sportsmen from Victoria (Australia)
People from Langwarrin, Victoria